Murray Street is one of four main east-west roads within the Perth central business district (CBD).

History
The street, the central portion of which has become a pedestrian mall, was named after Sir George Murray, Secretary of State for War and the Colonies from 1828 to 1830.

It is the one main road in Perth that has an eastern ending at a churchthe Roman Catholic St Mary's Cathedral; the other major churches in the CBD are on the sides of the city streets. The western end of Murray Street also once had a church with St Patrick’s Roman Catholic Church sitting on Havelock Street opposite the end of Murray Street. Murray Street was extended to Outram Street in 1937 and St Patrick’s was demolished. Murray Street was later extended further west to Thomas Street.

The intersections with the north-south running streets include Murray Street, where the Wentworth Hotel has been on the corner for over 100 years, though the earlier hotel at the location had a different name.

The mall was created later than the Hay Street mall and its central section had no hotels whereas Wellington, Hay and St Georges Terrace have.

The number of historic arcades linking with the Hay Street mall is significant compared to other parts of the CBD.

The western and eastern ends of the street have had significant changes in land use compared to the central section.

Shops and malls

The strip has many popular shops lining the street including flagship outlets for department stores such as Myer, David Jones, Woolworths and Target. Recent development along Murray Street has seen the addition of a number of both national and international retailers includingNespresso, Swarovski, G-Star Raw, Quiksilver, General Pants Co., Aquilla, Industrie, Hurley, Pandora, Zara and many more.

East Precinct
The Murray Street East Precinct includes the heritage listed area between Pier Street and Victoria Square. Notable buildings/features within the heritage precinct include;

 Young Australia League Building and House, a three storey rendered masonry and concrete building in the Inter-War Free Classical style (45 Murray Street) and adjacent two storey rendered and painted brick and iron roof house in the Federation Queen Anne style (55 Murray Street), has cultural heritage significance for the following reasons: the place has been associated with the activities of the Young Australia League from the time of purchase by the League in 1920/1921 and is associated with the founder of the Young Australia League, J.J. Simons, and with other prominent West Australians who were members of the organisation including State Premier Sir Walter James and prominent architect Lionel Boas whose architectural firm Oldham Boas was responsible for the design of the Young Australia League Building. It is also associated with the thousands of young people who took part in the programmes of the League; the Young Australia League Building is representative of the Young Australia League philosophy and a way of life based on the expression of Australian nationalism and has been associated with the development of youth organisations in Australia and overseas; the Young Australia League building is a rare example of the Inter-War Free Classical style enhanced by an unusual facade with a two-storey colonnade, semi-enclosed court and strong vertical detailing; the house, currently home to PHC Projects Management Consultants, is a simple example of a two storey late nineteenth century residential building, is the only residential style building in the Murray Street East Precinct and a rare example of a substantial late nineteenth century house in central Perth; the house was the home of a prominent member of the Roman Catholic community, philanthropist, property investor and politician Timothy Quinlan who, together with his father-in-law, Daniel Connor, invested in significant land holdings in central Perth which became known as the Connor-Quinlan Estate; the place forms an important component of the Murray Street East Precinct, which extends from Pier Street to Victoria Square, and the Young Australia League Building defines the corner of Murray Street and Irwin Street.
 Former Government Printing Office Building (78 Murray Street), now the Curtin Graduate School of Business.

Access
The Murray Street mall is directly connected to Perth railway station by an entry at the west end of the mall, and via Forrest Place to the original Perth railway station and the Museum of Western Australia. Parking garages are also located nearby.

Major intersections

See also

 List of lanes and arcades in Perth, Western Australia

Notes

External links

 1950s photo of Murray Street by Frank Hurley at the National Library of Australia

 
Pedestrian malls in Australia
Streets in Perth central business district, Western Australia
Streets in West Perth, Western Australia